"Every Other Freckle" is a song by English indie rock band alt-J. It was released as the third single from the band's second studio album This Is All Yours on 14 August 2014. Spin described it as "equal parts folk...Oompa Loompa anthem, and typical Alt-J sonic fuzziness..."

Charts

Weekly charts

Year-end charts

Certifications

Release history

References

Alt-J songs
2014 singles
2014 songs
Experimental rock songs
Songs written by Thom Sonny Green